Eliza Jane Trimble Thompson (1816–1905) was a temperance advocate.

Biography
Eliza Jane Trimble was born in Hillsboro, Ohio, August 24, 1816. The daughter of Governor Allen Trimble, Thompson was inspired by a December 23, 1873 lecture by Diocletian Lewis to begin leading groups of women into saloons where they sang hymns and prayed for the closure of the establishments. These direct, non-violent “Visitation Bands” were successful and quickly spread first across the state of Ohio and then to a total of 22 other states from New York to California. Dr. Lewis, a minister who had a drunken father which contributed to his desire for temperance and abstinence, believed that women needed to be educated on the social evils of alcohol.

"Mother Thompson" and others claimed often dramatic conversions by saloon keepers. In other cases, the retailers simply gave up after being picked on for weeks by the Visitation Bands.

Within several years the movement subsided. However, it was successful in stimulating the temperance movement, which had declined with the outbreak of the Civil War (1861–1865). The Woman's Christian Temperance Union (WCTU) traces its origins to the Women's Crusade against alcohol.

Thompson died on November 3, 1905, in Hillsboro.

Gallery

References

Sources

1816 births
1905 deaths
American temperance activists
People from Hillsboro, Ohio